A pinacotheca is an ancient Greek or Roman picture gallery.

Pinacotheca may also refer to:

 Pinacotheca, Melbourne
 Pinacotheca (Doctor Who)